Theódór Elmar Bjarnason (born 4 March 1987) is an Icelandic professional footballer who plays as a central midfielder for KR Reykjavík.

Club career

Early career
Born in Reykjavík, Iceland, Theódor played for KR Reykjavík in Iceland. He also played one season for the reserve team of the Norwegian club IK Start as a 16-year-old, but rejected an offer of a professional contract with them and moved back to Iceland.

Celtic
Theódór joined Celtic in 2004. He made his domestic debut for Celtic against Hibernian in the last game of the 2006–07 season and played the full 90 minutes in a match in which he was named man of the match by the Celtic website. He was also on the bench for the 1–0 win over Dunfermline in the 2007 Scottish Cup Final.

On 21 May 2007, Theódór announced he would put pen to paper on a two-year contract extension with Celtic to tie him to the club until the summer of 2009 and on 13 June, he signed a new three-year contract.

Lyn Oslo
On 15 January 2008, Theódór signed for Lyn Oslo, in a bid to play regular first team football again.

IFK Göteborg
Following severe financial difficulties in the running of Lyn, Theódór moved to IFK Göteborg on 22 July 2009.

Randers FC
In the start of 2012, Theódór signed a new contract with the Danish side Randers FC. However, he got injured in the start-up and was not able to play for six months.

AGF
In June 2015 he signed a two-year contract with the Danish club AGF. He left the club after two years.

Gazişehir Gaziantep
On 5 January 2019, Bjarnason signed with Turkish club Gazişehir Gaziantep for one and a half years.

Akhisarspor
On 24 July 2019, Bjarnason signed with Akhisarspor.

International career
He was part of the Icelandic Euro 2016 squad, contributing one assist and also played on the 2017 China Cup, where Iceland won silver medals.

Personal life
His grandfather, Theódór Jakob Guðmundsson, played for KR Reykjavík in the golden years of that club and competed against Liverpool in 1964 in the first European game for both of these clubs.

References

External links

Theodor Elmar Bjarnasson career stats at lynfotball.net

1987 births
Living people
Theodor Elmar Bjarnason
Association football midfielders
Theodor Elmar Bjarnason
Theodor Elmar Bjarnason
Theodor Elmar Bjarnason
Theodor Elmar Bjarnason
Celtic F.C. players
Scottish Premier League players
Lyn Fotball players
IFK Göteborg players
Theodor Elmar Bjarnason
Randers FC players
Aarhus Gymnastikforening players
Elazığspor footballers
Gaziantep F.K. footballers
Akhisarspor footballers
PAS Lamia 1964 players
Allsvenskan players
Eliteserien players
Danish Superliga players
TFF First League players
Super League Greece players
Theodor Elmar Bjarnason
Expatriate footballers in Norway
Expatriate footballers in Scotland
Expatriate footballers in Sweden
Expatriate men's footballers in Denmark
Expatriate footballers in Turkey
Expatriate footballers in Greece
UEFA Euro 2016 players